The 1923 CCNY Lavender football team was an American football team that represented the City College of New York (CCNY) as an independent during the 1923 college football season. The Lavender team compiled an 0–7 record for the season.

Schedule

References

CCNY
CCNY Beavers football seasons
College football winless seasons
CCNY Lavender football